Helene E. Kulsrud is a computer scientist known for her work developing graphical languages and compilers for the Cray-1 and other Cray super computers and debugging programs that allowed a user to interactively troubleshoot computer issues.

Education and career 
Kulsrud earned a B.A. in mathematics from Smith College in 1953 and has an M.A. in astrophysics from the University of Chicago (1955). She was a member of the honor society Phi Beta Kappa and member of the Association for Computing Machinery. 

Kulsrud worked at the Educational Testing Service from 1956 until 1957, serving as the head programmer. She then joined RCA in 1957 where she remained until 1965. From 1965 until 1966 she was a research associate at Yale University. In 1968 when she joined the Communications Research Division (CRD) of the Institute for Defense Analyses in Princeton, New Jersey, and as of 1984 she was the deputy head of the institute.

Kulsrud was a member of the Cray User Group, which shared software, developments, improvements, and suggestions for future hardware for Cray supercomputers; she served as president from 1985 at least to 1986. 

Kulsrud also worked on the U.S Department of Energy's Advanced Scientific Computing Advisory Committee from 2000 to 2004.

Work 
Kulsrud is known for her work in establishing the groundwork for graphical computer languages. While working at the Educational Testing Service she developed the use of computers to present SAT scores and statistically analyzed the results of the tests. During her time at Yale, she developed a general-purpose graphics language that could be used on multiple graphics devices. While at RCA Laboratories she combined her interest in mathematics and astronomy, writing programs designed to find solutions of differential equations. She also developed compilers, a debugging system for RCA computers that allowed the user to interactively debug code, and new computer language, IDAL and the compiler needed to run the language on the Cray-1 super computer. She also contributed to research on sonic booms.

Selected publications

Awards and honors 
Her work earned her and her team awards including a 1961 RCA Laboratories achievement award for her work on electron guns and a 1966 RCA team achievement for her work on Spectra computers. In 1984 Kulsrud received a YWCA Tribute to Women Award.

References 

1933 births
Smith College alumni
University of Chicago alumni
Women computer scientists
Living people